State Route 148 (SR-148) is a state highway in the U.S. state of Utah. The entire highway has been designated the Cedar Breaks Scenic Byway as part of the Utah Scenic Byways and National Forest Scenic Byway programs.

Route description
The route starts at its intersection with State Route 14 in Cedar Canyon. While the route ends here, continuing north along the road into the park leads to Utah's Patchwork Parkway/Brian Head-Lake Panguitch Scenic Byway (SR-143).

History
State Route 55 was designated by the Utah State Legislature in 1927, connecting SR-14 at Cedar Breaks Junction with the southern boundary of Cedar Breaks National Monument. However, as part of a major realignment of state highways, SR-55 was deleted in 1969, and the route was designated as part of SR-143. This left SR-143 as a non-contiguous highway, as the portion going through the national monument was not part of the highway designation.

In 1985, the southern portion of SR-143 between SR-14 and the southern Cedar Breaks National Monument boundary was re-designated State Route 148, with no further changes to this highway. The route was designated as a Utah Scenic Byway as the Cedar Breaks Scenic Byway, with a National Forest Scenic Byway designation following on February 6, 1991.

Major intersections

References

External links

 

 148
148
148